Sahitya Akademi Translation Prizes are awarded each year since 1989 by the Indian National Academy of Letters to writers for their outstanding translations work in the 24 languages.

Recipients  
Following is the list of recipients of Sahitya Akademi Translation Prizes for their works written in Telugu. The award, as of 2019, consisted of 50,000.

See also 
 List of Sahitya Akademi Award winners for Telugu

External links
 of Sahitya Akademi Translation Prize India

References

Sahitya Akademi Prize for Translation
Indian literary awards
Awards established in 1989
Translation awards
Telugu-language literature